Hussein Arab (born 22 November 1947) was the interior minister of Yemen from 1 December 2015 to 25 December 2017. He was born on 22 November 1947 in the village of Muqrin, Mudiyah District, Abyan Governorate, Yemen.

References 

Living people
Yemeni Sunni Muslims
People of the Yemeni Civil War (2014–present)
1947 births
People from Abyan Governorate

Interior ministers of Yemen
Deputy Prime Ministers of Yemen